The women's 800 metres event at the 2007 Summer Universiade was held on 11–14 August.

Medalists

Results

Heats
Qualification: First 3 of each heat (Q) and the next 4 fastest (q) qualified for the semifinals.

Semifinals
Qualification: First 4 of each semifinal qualified directly (Q) for the final.

Final

References
Results

800
2007 in women's athletics
2007